This is a list of Ugandan first-class cricketers. First-class cricket matches are those between international teams or the highest standard of domestic teams in which teams have two innings each. Generally, matches are eleven players a side but there have been exceptions. Today all matches must be scheduled to have at least three days' duration; historically, matches were played to a finish with no pre-defined timespan. The list is in alphabetical order.

References

first